Chandpur Bhangaha (also romanized as Chandpur Bhangha or Chandpur Bangaha) is a village in the Purnia district of Bihar, India.

See also
Aradhya National Convent School, Ashok Nagar

References

Mithila
Villages in Purnia district